The Skyluck was a 3,500-ton Panamanian-registered freighter that carried a cargo of 3,300 Chinese and Vietnamese boat people fleeing Vietnam four years after the fall of Saigon.  The ship left Vietnam from the Mekong delta city of Bến Tre, on January 24 1979, and after a sea voyage entered Hong Kong harbour under the cover of darkness on 8 February 1979. It was discovered and ordered to set anchor by the Hong Kong Police. Thus, began a -month-long stalemate as the refugees waited on the ship for the Hong Kong government to decide their fate.  The event turned into an international humanitarian incident, which was a symbol of a much larger problem: the estimated one million refugees who risked everything to flee Laos, Cambodia, and Vietnam in the aftermath of the Vietnam War.

Journey and Arrival in Hong Kong
In the early hours of Wednesday 7 February 1979, Skyluck arrived in the then-British colony of Hong Kong unannounced.  Hong Kong police did not detect the ship as it entered the territorial waters, until it anchored in the middle of Victoria Harbour. The ship was surrounded by police launches and boarded in the morning hours. Engine parts were removed to prevent escape.

Upon interrogation, the Taiwanese captain claimed that on his way from Singapore, in the course of legitimate shipping activity, freighter had come across several fishing boats in danger of sinking in the high seas, and had decided to rescue the refugees.

In fact, the purpose of the Skyluck’s voyage was human trafficking of Vietnamese refugees. Approximately 3,300 refugees had been shuttled in small boats from the city of Bến Tre, in early morning hours out to the waiting Skyluck. Most refugees had paid for passage in gold leaf or bars, in amounts that often represented life savings.  Some signed over property to the local government, such as land, house, boat, and personal possessions, in exchange for passage.  A few sneaked on-board without any payment at all.  Initially, a roster of 900 refugees were to be picked up by the freighter.  As the news leaked, thousands swarmed the boat and the refugee count swelled to more than 3,300. The freighter had to pull anchor, and as the freighter was dangerously overloaded, left behind a fleet of small fishing boats loaded with refugees trailing it. Many late arrivals could not get on-board and were left behind.

The gold payment, along with weapons including M-16 rifles to guard the gold, were delivered to the captain by the local smugglers The gold was never found on-board, and is thought to have been transferred to another boat during a rendezvous mid-voyage.

On January 31, 1979, the ship arrived at the Palawan Islands in the Philippines, and 600 refugees were allowed to get off.

Upon arriving in Hong Kong Harbour on February 7, the approximately 2,700 remaining refugees were not allowed to land; instead, the freighter was towed to the south coast of Lamma Island, several hundred yards off-shore. Refugees were confined to the ship for more than four months (until the freighter’s anchor chain was cut by refugees and the ship drifted aground on Lamma Island) while the Hong Kong government attempted to verify the refugee status of the passengers, and decide whether to allow them into the UNHCR-run refugee camps in the colony.

An act of desperation
The refugees waited aboard Skyluck in squalid conditions, although the Hong Kong government did provide basic necessities such as food and water.  On Sunday, 11 March 1979, after 33 days of waiting, a group of about 100 refugees jumped overboard and started to swim the mile to shore.  About fifty made it to Lamma Island, where they were promptly rounded up by police.  Two were admitted to hospital and treated for exhaustion.  While in custody, a group of young men unfurled a banner which read in English "Please Help Us", and tossed a message to the press through the wire fencing, which asked that the refugees be allowed to land. Those who didn't make it to shore were picked up by launches and returned to the freighter.  Those reaching shore were also returned to the ship.

An end to the stalemate
On 29 June 1979, after  months of waiting, some of the Skyluck refugees cut the anchor chain.  The ship drifted into the rocks at Lamma Island and began to sink.  The refugees jumped into the water or climbed down the side of the vessel on rope ladders, then scrambled up the rocky shores of the island.  By nightfall, about 2,000 people had been rounded up by police.  Most, if not all, were taken into custody shortly thereafter.  They ended up in the overcrowded camps already burgeoning with 10,000 refugees of the Vietnam War.  Many ended up immigrating to the United States, Australia, Canada, United Kingdom or Germany, but had lengthy waits before being accepted.

See also
 Vietnamese people in Hong Kong

References

External links

"Skyluck, the Ship that Smuggled 2,600 Boat People to Hong Kong – and Freedom"

Vietnamese diaspora
Vietnamese refugees
1979 in Hong Kong